San Joaquin County (Spanish: San Joaquín, meaning "St. Joachim"), officially the County of San Joaquin, is a county located in the U.S. state of California. As of the 2020 census, the population was 779,233. The county seat is Stockton.

San Joaquin County comprises the Stockton–Lodi–Tracy metropolitan statistical area within the regional San Jose–San Francisco–Oakland combined statistical area. The county is located in  Northern California's  Central Valley just east of the very highly populated nine-county San Francisco Bay Area region and is separated from the Bay Area by the Diablo Range of low mountains with its Altamont Pass. One of the smaller counties by area in California, it has a high population density and is growing rapidly due to overflow from the Bay Area's need for housing.

The City of San Joaquin, despite sharing its name with the county, is located in Fresno County.

History
San Joaquin County was one of the original United States counties of California, created in 1850 at the time of statehood.

The county was named for the San Joaquin River which runs through it. In the early 19th century Lieutenant Gabriel Moraga, commanding an expedition in the lower great California Central Valley, gave the name of San Joaquin (meaning Joachim) to the San Joaquin River, which springs from the southern Sierra Nevada.  San Joaquin County is the site of the San Joaquin Valley's first permanent residence.

Prior to incorporation in 1850, the area now encompassing San Joaquin County was inhabited by the Yokuts and Miwok native peoples. These communities lived in villages throughout the region, consuming diverse diets that reflected the flora and fauna of the California Delta. Acorns from Valley Oak trees, salmon runs on the San Joaquin, Mokelumne, Calaveras, and Stanislaus rivers, and Tule Elk were staples of the native diet, which was supplemented with various native berries and plants.  The native population of San Joaquin County fell dramatically during a statewide epidemic of malaria in 1828, and a subsequent rebellion of native peoples in the Central Valley, led by Chief Estanislao.

Between 1843 and 1846, during the era when California was a province of independent Mexico, five Mexican land grants were made in what would become San Joaquin County: Campo de los Franceses, Pescadero (Grimes), Pescadero (Pico), Sanjon de los Moquelumnes, and Thompson. The largest of these grants was the Rancho Campos de los Franceses, secured by Charles Weber and Guillermo Gulnac, which was eventually developed into the City of Stockton.

As the Gold Rush drew miners to the Sierra Nevada, Stockton grew into a major logistical and mercantile hub for the San Joaquin Valley and Mother Lode, which allowed for the City and County populations to rise significantly between 1850 and 1870. As the state's gold economy waned in the 1870s, San Joaquin County transitioned into a major national center of agriculture, which it remains to this day. Reclamation of the California delta, which began in 1869, strongly benefited this agricultural growth. The importance of agriculture to the region's economy led to the creation of a dynamic industrial engineering sector in Stockton, Lodi, and nearby Rio Vista in the 1880s. Notably, the Sperry Flour Company, Holt Manufacturing Company, the operation of R. G. LeTourneau, Samson Ironworks, and the canning empire of Tillie Lewis were firms of national and international significance. Holt Manufacturing, led by Benjamin Holt, would pioneer the industrial manufacturing and sales of the tractor, while R.G. LeTourneau patented the bulldozer in 1926.

Importance to railroads
The Central Pacific Railroad in the 1860s utilized San Joaquin County's exceptionally flat terrain to construct a rail line from Sacramento to Stockton and then southwest through Altamont Pass to the San Francisco Bay. In 1909, a second railroad, the Western Pacific, utilized the same route through Stockton to reach the Bay Area. In the early 1900s, the Santa Fe Railroad constructed from Bakersfield and Fresno through Stockton north to reach Oakland. Smaller lines constructed at Stockton were the Tidewater Southern to Modesto and the Central California Traction to Sacramento. Both started as electrically powered. These railroads encouraged the growth of farms, orchards, and ranches in San Joaquin County and adjacent counties.

Tracy tire fire
On August 7, 1998, a tire fire ignited at S.F. Royster's Tire Disposal just south of Tracy on South MacArthur Drive, near Linne Rd. The tire dump held over 7 million illegally stored tires and was allowed to burn for more than two years before it was extinguished. Allowing the fire to burn was considered to be a better way to avoid groundwater contamination than putting it out. However, the cleanup cost $19 million and local groundwater was still discovered to be contaminated.

Geography
The county has a very low inland elevation and a very flat drainage basin for the San Joaquin River and its numerous tributaries. With the resulting exceptionally high water table, the county is a marshy and swampy delta with a tendency to flood in the spring with melting snow runoff from the Sierra Mountains.

The geographical center of San Joaquin County is near Stockton at approximately 37°54'N 121°12'W (37.9,-121.2).

National protected area
 San Joaquin River National Wildlife Refuge (part)

Demographics

2020 census

Note: the US Census treats Hispanic/Latino as an ethnic category. This table excludes Latinos from the racial categories and assigns them to a separate category. Hispanics/Latinos can be of any race.

2011

Places by population, race, and income

2010 Census
The 2010 United States Census reported that San Joaquin County had a population of 685,306. The racial makeup of San Joaquin County was 349,287 (51.0%) White, 51,744 (7.6%) African American, 7,196 (1.1%) Native American, 98,472 (14.4%) Asian, 3,758 (0.5%) Pacific Islander, 131,054 (19.1%) from other races, and 43,795 (6.4%) from two or more races.  Hispanic or Latino of any race were 266,341 persons (38.9%). The Filipino American population was 46,447, just under half (47%) of all Asian Americans in San Joaquin County, and as of 1990 have been the largest population of Asian Americans in the county.

2000
As of the census of 2000, there were 563,598 people, 181,629 households, and 134,768 families residing in the county.  The population density was 403 people per square mile (156/km2).  There were 189,160 housing units at an average density of 135 per square mile (52/km2).  The racial makeup of the county was 58.1% White, 6.7% Black or African American, 1.1% Native American, 11.4% Asian, 0.4% Pacific Islander, 16.3% from other races, and 6.1% from two or more races.  30.5% of the population were Hispanic or Latino of any race. 9.3% were of German, 5.3% Irish and 5.0% English ancestry according to Census 2000. 66.4% spoke English, 21.3% Spanish, 2.2% Tagalog, 1.8% Mon-Khmer or Cambodian, 1.1% Vietnamese and 1.1% Hmong as their first language.

There were 181,629 households, out of which 40.5% had children under the age of 18 living with them, 54.3% were married couples living together, 14.0% had a female householder with no husband present, and 25.8% were non-families. 20.7% of all households were made up of individuals, and 8.4% had someone living alone who was 65 years of age or older.  The average household size was 3.00 and the average family size was 3.48.

In the county, the population was spread out, with 31.0% under the age of 18, 10.0% from 18 to 24, 28.8% from 25 to 44, 19.6% from 45 to 64, and 10.6% who were 65 years of age or older.  The median age was 32 years. For every 100 females there were 99.9 males.  For every 100 females age 18 and over, there were 97.2 males.

The median income for a household in the county was $41,282, and the median income for a family was $46,919. Males had a median income of $39,246 versus $27,507 for females. The per capita income for the county was $17,365.  About 13.5% of families and 17.7% of the population were below the poverty line, including 23.7% of those under age 18 and 10.0% of those age 65 or over.

Metropolitan statistical area
The United States Office of Management and Budget has designated San Joaquin County as the Stockton–Lodi, CA Metropolitan Statistical Area. The United States Census Bureau ranked the Stockton–Lodi, CA Metropolitan Statistical Area as the 76th most populous metropolitan statistical area of the United States as of July 1, 2012.

The Office of Management and Budget has further designated the Stockton–Lodi, CA Metropolitan Statistical Area as a component of the more extensive San Jose–San Francisco–Oakland, CA Combined Statistical Area, the 5th most populous combined statistical area and primary statistical area of the United States as of July 1, 2012.

Government and policing

County Government 
The Government of San Joaquin County is defined and authorized under the California Constitution and California law as a general law county. Much of the Government of California is in practice the responsibility of county governments, such as the Government of San Joaquin County. The County government provides countywide services such as elections and voter registration, law enforcement, jails, vital records, property records, tax collection, public health, and social services. In addition the County serves as the local government for all unincorporated areas. Some chartered cities such as Stockton and Tracy provide their own municipal services such as police, public safety, libraries, parks and recreation, and zoning. Some other cities arrange to have the County provide some or all of these services on a contract basis.

The County government is composed of the elected five-member four-year-term board of supervisors (BOS), which operates in a legislative, executive, and quasi-judicial capacity; several other elected offices including the Sheriff, District Attorney, and Assessor; and numerous county departments and entities under the supervision of the county administrator.

As of January 2019, the supervisors are:
 Miguel Villapudua (District 1 and Chair),
 Katherine Miller (District 2),
 Tom Patti (District 3 and Vice Chair),
 Charles Winn (District 4), and
 Bob Elliott (District 5).

In addition, several entities of the government of California have jurisdiction conterminous with San Joaquin County, such as the San Joaquin County Superior Court, and the California Department of Corrections and Rehabilitation operates the Deuel Vocational Institution a state prison in unincorporated San Joaquin County near Tracy.

Policing

The San Joaquin County sheriff provides court protection and jail administration for the entire county. It provides patrol and detective services for the unincorporated areas of the county. Lathrop contracts with the Sheriff for its police services. Municipalities within the county that have municipal police departments are: Stockton, 310,000; Tracy, 89,000; Manteca, 77,000; Lodi, 65,000; Lathrop, 23,000 (sheriff contract); Ripon, 17,000; Escalon, 7,200,

Politics

Voter registration

Cities by population and voter registration

Overview

In the California State Assembly, San Joaquin County is split between 3 legislative districts:
 ,
 , and
 .

On November 4, 2008, San Joaquin County voted 65.5% in favor of Proposition 8 which amended the California Constitution to ban same-sex marriages.

For most of its history, San Joaquin County has been a Republican-leaning swing county, voting for the national winner in all but 4 presidential elections (1884, 1948, 1960, 1976) from 1880 to 2012. In 2016, Hillary Clinton became the first Democratic Party candidate who lost nationally to win the county, and she did so by a sizable margin of around 14 points. Conversely, Donald Trump posted the worst result in county history for a national Republican Party electoral college winner, being held to under 40% of the vote. In 2020, Trump vastly increased upon his 2016 results, securing more votes than any Republican candidate in history. Despite this, he only barely passed 40% due to a similarly large increase on the Democratic side.

Crime

County crime
Number of incidents reported and crime rate per 1,000 persons for each type:

Cities crime

Economy

Agriculture
As of 2018, the gross value of agricultural production in the county was $2.6 billion. The top product was almonds, followed by grapes, milk, and walnuts.

San Joaquin County is home to one of the largest walnut processing facilities in the world, DeRuosi Nut. Another large company, Pacific State Bancorp (PSBC), was based here but was closed by the California Department of Financial Institutions on August 20, 2010.

Business and industry
San Joaquin County is home to several large manufacturing, general services, and agricultural companies, including Archer Daniels Midland, Blue Shield of California, Dart Container, Holz Rubber Company, Kubota Tractors, Lodi Iron Works, Miller Packing Company, Pacific Coast Producers, Tiger Lines, Valley Industries, and Woodbridge-Robert Mondavi.[23]

As of 2019, about 260,000 people were employed in the county, with nearly 200,000 employed in private industry and about 44,500 employed in government.

As of 2013, the goods movement industry is also an important part of the local economy, with an Amazon fulfillment  center in Tracy and the Port of Stockton.

Education

San Joaquin County is home to 18 public school districts and numerous private schools.

K-12:

 Escalon Unified School District
 Lammersville Joint Unified School District
 Lincoln Unified School District
 Linden Unified School District
 Lodi Unified School District
 Manteca Unified School District
 Ripon Unified School District
 Stockton Unified School District
 Tracy Unified School District - Covers some areas for K-12 and some for 9-12 only

Secondary:
 Galt Joint Union High School District
 Oakdale Joint Unified School District (while it is a unified school district, it only covers 9-12 in its sections in this county)

Elementary:

 Banta Elementary School District
 Galt Joint Union Elementary School District
 Jefferson Elementary School District
 New Hope Elementary School District
 New Jerusalem Elementary School District
 Oak View Union Elementary School District
 Valley Home Joint Elementary School District

School districts include:
 

On June 8, 2010, Lammersville Unified School District was approved in Mountain House.

The San Joaquin Delta Community College District is composed of San Joaquin Delta College located in Stockton and covers San Joaquin County as well as Rio Vista in Solano County, Galt in Sacramento County, and a large portion of Calaveras County.

A private university, the University of the Pacific, has its main campus in Stockton.

Media

San Joaquin County is in the Sacramento television market, and thus receives Sacramento media.

The Record, The Manteca Bulletin, and The Lodi News-Sentinel are daily newspapers. Bilingual Weekly News publishes a weekly newspaper in both Spanish and English. Tracy Press also publishes a weekly newspaper.

Big Monkey Group publishes four Stockton magazines: Weston Ranch Monthly, Brookside Monthly, Spanos Park Monthly and On the Mile. Caravan is a local community arts and events monthly tabloid. The Central Valley Business Journal is a monthly business tabloid. Karima Magazine is a popular/consumer magazine covering the Central Valley as well as newsworthy events in the Bay Area. San Joaquin Magazine is a regional lifestyle magazine covering Stockton, Lodi, Tracy, and Manteca. The Downtowner is a free monthly guide to downtown Stockton's events, commerce, real estate, and other cultural and community happenings.

Poets' Espresso Review is a periodical that has been based in Stockton, mostly distributed by mail, since summer of 2005. Artifact is a San Joaquin Delta College periodical based in Stockton since December 2006, featuring writing in all genres, photography, and visual media by students, staff and faculty as well as community members. The Pacifican, University of the Pacific's newspaper since 1908 features News, Opinion, Lifestyles, and Sports pertinent to the Pacific campus and surrounding Stockton community.

In popular culture
The television show Sons of Anarchy was set in Charming, California, a fictional town in San Joaquin County.

Transportation

Major highways

  Interstate 5
  Interstate 205
  Interstate 580
  State Route 4
  State Route 12
  State Route 26
  State Route 33
  State Route 88
  State Route 99
  State Route 120
  State Route 132

Public transportation
San Joaquin Regional Transit District provides city bus service within Stockton. RTD also runs intercity routes throughout the county, and subscription commuter routes to Livermore, Pleasanton, Sacramento, and Santa Clara County.

The cities of Lodi, Escalon, Manteca, Tracy and Ripon operate their own bus systems.

Train and bus service

Greyhound buses and Amtrak trains both stop in Stockton. Amtrak's Oakland-Stockton-Fresno-Bakersfield San Joaquins trains stop at the San Joaquin Street Station. This is the former Santa Fe Railroad station in Stockton. Amtrak's Sacramento-Stockton-Fresno- Bakersfield "San Joaquin" trains stop at the Robert J. Cabral Station which is also used by Altamont Corridor Express trains to San Jose which originate in Stockton.  This is the former Southern Pacific Railroad station in Stockton. RTD Hopper is a public bus service operated by San Joaquin Regional Transit connecting Stockton to Ripon, Manteca, Tracy, Lodi, and Lathrop.

Airports
Stockton Metropolitan Airport features passenger service to Los Angeles, Las Vegas, San Diego, and Phoenix, AZ, along with cargo service and general aviation. Other general aviation airports in the county include Lodi Airport, Tracy Municipal Airport, and New Jerusalem Airport.

Port

Communities

Cities
 Escalon
 Lathrop
 Lodi
 Manteca
 Ripon
 Stockton (county seat)
 Tracy

Census-designated places

 Acampo
 August 
 Collierville
 Country Club
 Dogtown
 Farmington
 French Camp
 Garden Acres
 Kennedy
 Lincoln Village
 Linden
 Lockeford
 Morada
 Mountain House
 Peters
 Taft Mosswood
 Terminous
 Thornton
 Victor
 Waterloo
 Woodbridge

Unincorporated communities
 Atlanta
 Banta
 Goodmans Corner
 Mormon
 Vernalis
 Youngstown

Population ranking

The population ranking of the following table is based on the 2010 census of San Joaquin County.

† county seat

See also

Conergy
Irrigation district
List of museums in the San Joaquin Valley
List of school districts in San Joaquin County, California
National Register of Historic Places listings in San Joaquin County, California
San Joaquin County Historical Society and Museum

Notes

References

External links

 
 San Joaquin County Office of Emergency Services (OES)
 San Joaquin County Office of Education
 San Joaquin County Superior Court
 South San Joaquin Irrigation District

 
California counties
San Joaquin Valley
1850 establishments in California
Populated places established in 1850
Majority-minority counties in California